Etouwan Station, is a station of Line 1 of Wuhan Metro. It entered revenue service on July 29, 2010. It is located in Qiaokou District.

Station layout

Transfers
Bus transfers to Route 218, 222, 505, 546, 560, 621, 736, 737, 741 are available at Etouwan Station.

References

Wuhan Metro stations
Line 1, Wuhan Metro
Railway stations in China opened in 2010